Phosphate carrier protein, mitochondrial is a protein that in humans is encoded by the SLC25A3 gene. The encoded protein is a transmembrane protein located in the mitochondrial inner membrane and catalyzes the transport of phosphate ions across it for the purpose of oxidative phosphorylation. There are two significant isoforms of this gene expressed in human cells, which differ slightly in structure and function. Mutations in this gene can cause mitochondrial phosphate carrier deficiency (MPCD), a fatal disorder of oxidative phosphorylation symptomized by lactic acidosis, neonatal hypotonia, hypertrophic cardiomyopathy, and death within the first year of life.

Structure 
The SLC25A3 gene is located on the q arm of chromosome 12 in position 23.1 and spans 8,376 base pairs. The gene has 9 exons and produces a 40.1 kDa protein composed of 362 amino acids. The encoded protein (PHC) is a multi-pass transmembrane protein located in the mitochondrial inner membrane; it contains six transmembrane segments, emerging into a large extramembranous loop. Both the N-terminal and C-terminal regions of this protein protrude toward the cytosol. PHC contains three related segments arranged in tandem which are related to those found in other characterized members of the mitochondrial carrier family. There exist two transcript variants of this protein, PHC-A and PHC-B, which differ by 13 amino acids. Isoform A contains 42 amino acids while Isoform B contains 41. In vitro, the isoforms differ in their substrate affinities and transport rates.

Function 
The encoded protein (PHC) catalyzes the transport of phosphate from the cytosol into the mitochondrial matrix, either by proton cotransport or in exchange for hydroxyl ions. In the final steps of oxidative phosphorylation, this protein catalyzes the uptake of a phosphate ion with a proton across the mitochondrial inner membrane. The availability of inorganic phosphate for oxidative phosphorylation is mainly dependent on PHC activity. To substantially affect oxidative phosphorylation, PHC depletion must be severe, exceeding 85%. This protein may be involved in regulation of the mitochondrial permeability transition pore (mPTP).

Clinical significance 
Mutations in this gene can cause mitochondrial phosphate carrier deficiency (MPCD), a fatal disorder of oxidative phosphorylation. Symptoms include lactic acidosis, hypertrophic cardiomyopathy, and neonatal hypotonia; afflicted patients die within the first year of life.

Isoform A of this gene is expressed at high levels in heart, pancreatic, and skeletal muscle cells while Isoform B is expressed in all tissues, albeit poorly.

In the sole recorded case of a mutation in this gene, a homozygous mutation (c.215G>A) in the alternatively spliced exon 3A of this gene caused an amino acid replacement (G72E) in Isoform A. This leads to ATP synthase deficiency in muscle cells, which express Isoform A, but not in fibroblasts, which express Isoform B, causing MPCD and the aforementioned standard symptoms.

Interactions 
The encoded protein interacts with PPIF; this interaction is impaired by CsA.

See also 
 Solute carrier family

References

Further reading 

 
 
 
 
 
 
 
 
 
 
 

Solute carrier family